Michael Bates may refer to:

 Michael Bates (actor) (1920–1978), British actor
 Michael Bates (American football) (born 1969), sprinter and American football kick returner
 Michael Bates, Baron Bates (born 1961), British Conservative Party politician
 Michael Bates (New Zealand cricketer) (born 1983), New Zealand cricketer
 Michael Bates (English cricketer) (born 1990), English cricketer
 Michael Bates (Sealand) (born 1952), businessman and self-declared Prince of the Principality of Sealand

See also
 Mick Bates (disambiguation)
 Michael Bate (born  1947), Canadian media entrepreneur
 Mike Bate (born 1943), English biologist